Prothoma Kadambini was an Indian Bengali television biographical period drama based on the biography of the first practising female physician of British-ruled India and South Asia, Doctor Kadambini Ganguly. The show was aired on Bengali General Entertainment Channel Star Jalsha and is also available on digital platform Hotstar, that  was premiered on 16 March 2020. The show is produced by Shree Venkatesh Films and starred by Solanki Roy and Honey Bafna in lead roles. The show went to off-air on 28 February 2021.

Plot 
Kadambini Ganguly (née Basu), following her upbringing and her struggles to obtain her medical education and eventually becoming successful doctor with the help of her school teacher who later turned to her husband, the social reformer Dwarakanath Ganguly. Even after the demise of her husband, she continues her job and earnest attempt to reform the society alongside taking care of her family and finally becomes an immortal figure of our history.

Cast

Main
 Solanki Roy as Dr. Kadambini Ganguly (née Bose) aka Bini
 Meghan Chakraborty as young Bini
 Honey Bafna as Dwarakanath Ganguly aka Dwarka

Recurring
 Animesh Bhaduri as Brojokishore Basu, Bini's father
 Bidipta Chakraborty as Kanak Devi, Bini's mother
 Pritha Roy as Soudamini Basu, Bini's younger sister
 Rohit Samanta / Fahim Mirza as Monomohun Ghose
 Rupsa Chatterjee as Swarnalata Ghose
 Prantik Banerjee as Nanda, Bini's paternal uncle
 Sananda Basak as Nanda's wife
 Kaushiki Guha as Bini's elder paternal aunt
 Suchismita Chowdhury as Bini's younger paternal aunt 
 Brishti Banerjee as Labanya, Bini's Rangadidi
 Payel De as Bhabosundari Ganguly (Devi), Dwarkanath's first wife
 Rupsha Mondal as Bidhumukhi Ray Chowdhury (née Ganguly), Dwarakanath's eldest daughter
 Sanmitra Bhaumik as Upendrakishore Ray Chowdhury
 Samantak Dyuti Maitra / Nilotpal Banerjee as Satish Ganguly
 Kheyali Dastidar as Udaytara Ganguly, Dwarakanath's mother
 Sritama Bhattacharjee as Agomoni, Dwarakanath's younger sister
 Shampa Banerjee as Promila, Dwarakanath's another younger sister, Agomoni's elder sister
 Dwaipayan Das as Surendranath Ganguly aka Suren, Dwaraka's cousin
 Jagriti Goswami Ghatak as Shashibala, Bhabosundari's sister & Suren's wife
 Gulshanara Khatun as Surobala, Kadambini's personal assistant
 Rahul Dev Bose as Dr. Mahim Sen, a doctor
 Bhaswar Chatterjee / Anindya Banerjee as Dr. Rajendra Chandra Chandra, Bini's medical college teacher
 Bhaskar Banerjee as Raybahadur Sardakanta Deb
Avijit Sarkar as Dr.Bose
 Sarbadaman Som as Dr. Sanyal
 Krishnendu Adhikari as Shibnath Shastri
 Debomoy Mukherjee as Ananda Mohan Bose
 Avijit Dev Roy as Dr. Annada Khastagir
 Rumpa Chatterjee as Manoroma Das, a neighbor of Ganguly family at Cornwallis street house 
 Tarun Chakraborty as Rasbihari Das, Manoroma's husband
 Senjuti Sen as Bindubasini, another neighbor at Cornwallis street house
 Debjoy Mallick as Surendranath Banerjee 
 Deb Chatt as Durga Mohan Das
 Sujata Daw as Brahmamoyee Debi, Durgamohan's first wife
 Ivana Dutta as Miss Annette Akroyd
 Sutirtha Saha as Keshab Chandra Sen
 Prantik Choudhury as Ishwar Chandra Vidyasagar 
 Sayani Sengupta Dutta as Soroju, Sardakanta's granddaughter
 Priya Malakar as Sarala Roy(Das), Durgamohan's elder daughter
 Nisha Poddar as Abala Bose(Das) Durgamohan's younger daughter
 Prapti Chatterjee as Swarnaprabha Bose, Ananda Mohan's wife
 Kaushambi Chakraborty as Horosundori Devi
 Tanushree Saha as Nistarini
 Ananya Sen as Chandramukhi Basu
 Riya Roy as Manomoyee
 Ashmita Chakraborty as Jagattarini Sen, Dr. Mahim Sen's wife
 Rubel Ghosh as Jyotibhushan Sarkar
Swarnodipto Ghose as Nilratan Sarkar
Shovan Chakraborty as Shivaprashad
 Arush Dutta as Lalkamal Dutta
 Suprabhat Mukherjee as Jagannath Bhattacharya
 Writwik Mukherjee as Bagalacharan
 Anirban Paitandi as Kanailal Majumder
 Ankita Chakraborty as Anandibai Gopalrao Joshi
 Basabdatta Chatterjee as Jnanadanandini Devi
 Priyam as Rabindranath Tagore
 Diya Mukherjee as Binodini Dasi
 Akash Ghosh as Dr. Prafulla Chandra Ray
 Phalguni Chatterjee as Ramakrishna
 Mufin Chakraborty as Lady Dufferin
 Arundhati Chakraborty as Jyotirmayee Ganguly
 Arunava Dey as Probhatchandra Ganguly
 Tania Kar as Dr. Mahim Sen's sister-in-law
 Pinky Mallick as Bhabosundari's mother
 Indranil Mallick as Biren
 Chaitali Mukhopadhyay as Renubala
 Ananda S Choudhuri as Nabakumar Bose, Binodini Dasi's admirer
 Sarbari Mukherjee as Lokkhimoni Naptani, a local matchmaker in Bhagalpur
 Ratan Sarkhel as Gopal Boidyo
 Samir Kundu as Parashor Boidyo
 Pratyusha Saha as Charu

Production
The show is produced by Shree Venkatesh Films. Prothoma Kadambini was on a halt after airing 5 episodes because of the restrictions on shooting of all television and film productions following the lockdown in India enforced for COVID-19 Pandemic from 18 March 2020. The telecast resumed from 15 June 2020.

It has done well in television ratings. Moreover, the show had secured its position in the top ten most viewed shows on Bengali television in 15+ Urban BARC TRP chart on the week 42, 43 and 44 in the year 2020.
This biopic based on the real lifestory of Dr Kadambini Ganguly had ranked 8th position in Top 10  Bangla serial of 2021 that were popular in the Bengal (India) then.

Awards and nominations

References

External links 
Official Website 

Bengali-language television programming in India
2020 Indian television series debuts
Star Jalsha original programming
2021 Indian television series endings
Indian drama television series